Noor TV (meaning "light" in the Arabic language) is a US based  Afghan satellite television network, operating from Pleasanton, California. The station is available on Galaxy 25 satellite dish throughout North America.

Noor TV's programs are broadcast 24-hours and include: world news, children's and youth programming, game, cooking, music and talk shows.

The mission of Noor TV is to promote harmony in the oft-fractious Afghan communities in the United States and Canada.

Three Afghan Americans brothers of Fremont, California (Yama Yousefzai, Haris Rahimi and Farzan Rahimi) founded and launched Noor TV on 29 July 2007 and first appeared on television screens on 1 August 2007.

References 
 Noor TV - Official website

Mass media in Afghanistan
Television channels and stations established in 2007